Monkey on Your Back is a single by the Canadian rock musician, Aldo Nova. Released from his album Subject...Aldo Nova in 1983, the song climbed to number 12 on Billboard magazine's Album Rock Tracks chart.

1983 singles
Aldo Nova songs
1983 songs
Songs written by Aldo Nova
Portrait Records singles